Plesiomyzon baotingensis is a species of gastromyzontid loach endemic to Hainan Island, China. It is the only species in its genus. It grows to  SL.

References

Gastromyzontidae
Fish described in 1980
Monotypic fish genera
Freshwater fish of China
Endemic fauna of Hainan